El Corsario Negro ("The Black Corsair") is a 1944 Mexican film. It was directed by Chano Urueta and stars Pedro Armendariz, Jose Baviera, June Marlowe, and Maria Luisa Zea.  The film is based on the novel The Black Corsair by Emilio Salgari.  It is the story of a seventeenth-century pirate (Pedro Armendariz) who declares a ceaseless war against the injustice of a cruel governor (Jose Baviera) of Maracaibo.  In the course of his struggle, he finds the love of a beautiful maiden (June Marlowe), and loses his childhood friend (Maria Luisa Zea).

The film is in the public domain in both Mexico and the United States.

References

External links
 

1944 films
1940s Spanish-language films
Films directed by Chano Urueta
Films based on The Corsairs of the Antilles
Films set in the 1660s
Mexican black-and-white films
Mexican adventure films
1944 adventure films
1940s Mexican films
1940s Italian films